Zabol (also transliterated as Zâbol or Zābul) is a city and capital of Zabol County, Sistan and Baluchestan Province, Iran. Zabol is near the border with Afghanistan. Referred to as Sistan until the late 1920s, the city was renamed Zabol by Reza Shah Pahlavi.  At the 2006 census, its population was 130,642, in 27,867 families.

Zabol is located near Lake Hamun and the region is irrigated by the Helmand River. Lake Hamun is a seasonal lake that is often dry. The people of Zabol are mixed of Persians who speak a variant of the Persian language and known as Sistani or Seistani which is very similar to Dari, also known as Afghan Persian, and a small minority of Baloch who speak Balochi, a Northwestern Iranian language.

The city is home to Zabol University, the largest university in the city, as well as the Zabol Medical Science University and the Sistan Museum of Anthropology. Zabol has a regional airport.

Zabol is connected by road to Milak and Zaranj (across the border in Afghanistan). The Delaram-Zaranj Highway provides road connectivity to the rest of Afghanistan. Zabol thus provides Afghanistan access to the Arabian Sea and Persian Gulf via the Port of Chabahar.

Geography
Zabol is located near Lake Hamun and the region is irrigated by the Helmand River.

Zabol is connected by road to Milak and Zaranj (across the border in Afghanistan). The Delaram-Zaranj Highway provides road connectivity to the rest of Afghanistan. Zabol thus provides Afghanistan access to the Arabian Sea and Persian Gulf via the Port of Chabahar.

Air pollution

The Zabol area is well known for its "120-day wind" (bād-e sad-o-bist-roz), a highly persistent dust storm in the summer which blows from north to south. The disappearance in the 2000s of the nearby Hamoun wetlands has exacerbated the dusty conditions in Zabol, leading the World Health Organization to name Zabol the most polluted city in the world in 2016. A 2017 study in the journal Preventive Medicine suggested that the harm from 30 minutes of cycling outdoors in Zabol's polluted air would outweigh the benefits of the exercise.

Climate
Zabol has a hot desert climate (Köppen climate classification BWh).

Colleges and universities 

 Zabol University
 Zabol University of Medical Sciences
 Islamic Azad university, Zabol Branch
 Payame-noor university of Zabol

References

External links

Populated places in Zabol County
Cities in Sistan and Baluchestan Province